I.P. Mission High School Jhalod is a school in Jhalod, State of Gujarat, in India.

The school was established by Irish missionary Dr. Jean Shaom in 1987. Today, it is run by Gujarat Christian Service Society.  The school was founded for all residents of Jhalod, including the  tribal community.  The Gujarat Christian Service Society is a Registered Public Charitable Christian Trust under the Bombay Public Trust Act, 1950.
High schools and secondary schools in Gujarat
Christian schools in Gujarat
Dahod district
Educational institutions established in 1987
1987 establishments in Gujarat